Thinley Dorji (born 5 May 1995) is a Bhutanese international footballer, currently playing for Yeedzin. He made his first appearance for the Bhutan national football team in 2012.

References

Bhutanese footballers
Bhutan international footballers
Yeedzin F.C. players
Living people
1995 births
Association football midfielders